Chandrasekharpur is a commercial area in Odisha's capital city, Bhubaneswar.

Landmarks
 Bhubaneswar Golf Club
 Bhubaneswar Driving Test Center
 Bhubaneswar Stock Exchange
 Software Technology Parks of India

Economy

Information Technology 
Many Information technology companies are present here.
 AABSyS IT
ESSPL 
 Infosys
 Mindtree
 Tata Consultancy Services
 Wipro
 Mahindra Satyam

Other Companies 
It is also a hub for many other companies like :
 Monginis
 Ferro Alloys Corporation
 Fortune Tower
 Dhamra Port Company (DPCL)
 Aircel
 Ericsson India
 ESSAR Steel India Limited
 Indian Railway Catering and Tourism Corporation (IRCTC)
 Mittal Steel Company, India
 Mitsubishi India
 Odisha Power Generation Corporation
 POSCO India
 Reliance Industries
 Reliance Communications
 Semtech
 Software Technology Parks of India
 State Bank of India, Branch Office
 Tata Steel
 Tata Teleservices

Education

Colleges/Universities 
 Institute of Life Sciences
 KIIT School of Management
 Regional College of Management
 Regional Medical Research Center, Bhubaneswar
 Silicon Institute of Technology

Schools
 D.A.V. Public School, Chandrasekharpur
 SAI International School
 KIIT International School

Amenities
 Care Hospitals

References

Neighbourhoods in Bhubaneswar